Robert Sigei Kipngetich (born 3 January 1982) is a Kenyan long-distance runner. He has competed at meets on the IAAF Golden League and IAAF Grand Prix circuits. He finished eleventh in the 5000 metres at the 2005 World Athletics Final.

Personal bests
3000 metres - 7:39.02 min (2007)
5000 metres - 13:06.71 min (2007)
10,000 metres - 27:04.18 min (2007)

External links

1982 births
Living people
Kenyan male long-distance runners